Grajaú River is a river of Acre state in western Brazil.

See also
List of rivers of Acre

References
Brazilian Ministry of Transport
The British Museum

Rivers of Acre (state)